Sheohar (pronounced, Shivahar) is the principal city of Sheohar district in Bihar, India. It is Located Northwest City 31.06 kilometres Kasba Mehsi in Mehsi It is a part of the Tirhut Division.

Geography
Sheohar is located at coor 26.52N, 85.3E. It has an average elevation of 53 metres (173 feet).
Train Mejor Cities of Indian from Mehsi railway station distance 13 kilometres (in East Champaran district adjacent to Mehsi) including the Sapat Karanti super fast Express to Delhi, Mithila Express to Kolkata, Lokmanya Tilak express to Mumbai, and awadh express and Grib rath Thus, Kaswa Mehsi has direct connectivity to major Indian cities like – Patna, Varanasi, Haridwar, Chandigarh, Dehradun, Allahabad, Kolkata, New Delhi, Mumbai, Bhopal, Amritsar, Guwahati, Bhopal, Lucknow, Gorakhpur, Kanpur, Ranchi, Raipur, Nagpur, Hyderabad, etc. Mehsi railway station is situated on Muzaffarpur–Gorakhpur main line under the Samastipur railway division of East Central Railway zone.[1]

References

External links
 

Cities and towns in Sheohar district